Philip Gell may refer to:

 Sir Philip Gell, 3rd Baronet (1651–1719), lead-mining magnate and Member of Parliament for Derbyshire
 Philip Eyre Gell (1723–1795), probable builder of the Via Gellia, of the Gell baronets
 Philip Gell (1775–1842), last of the mining family, High Sheriff of Derbyshire
 Philip Lyttelton Gell (1852–1926), British editor for Oxford University Press
 Philip George Houthem Gell (1914–2001), immunologist working in postwar Britain